The 2020–21 season is Universo Treviso Basket's 9th in existence (6th after the re-foundation) and the club's 2nd consecutive season in the top tier Italian basketball.

Kit 
Supplier: Erreà / Sponsor: De'Longhi

Players

Current roster

Depth chart

Squad changes

In

|}

Out

|}

Confirmed 

|}

From youth team 

|}

Coach

Competitions

Supercup

Serie A

Regular season

Playoffs

Quarterfinals

See also 

 2020–21 LBA season
 2020 Italian Basketball Supercup

References 

2020–21 in Italian basketball by club